Schmitzia hiscockiana is a small, rare, red seaweed or marine alga of the phylum Rhodophyta or red algae. It was discovered and named in 1985.

Distribution
This small red marine alga is known from most coasts of Ireland, Wales, England, and Scandinavia.

Habitat
This species is known only from the sublittoral zone to 15m depth; it grows on cobbles and pebbles.

Species description
The gametophyte phase is a soft and gelatinous plant, no more than 8 cm long, 6 cm wide and a few millimeters thick. It is flattened and divided in a leaf-like manner with marginal proliferations. Rose pink in colour, the blades are composed of a filamentous axis bearing whorls of branchlets, four or five per axial cell. These whorls of branchlets form a cortex.

Life history
The plants are monoecious, bearing spermatia and carpogonia. After fertilization and development of connecting filaments and fusion with intercalary vegetative cells, a carposporphyte develops.  The tetrasporophyte phase is  crustose and unknown in the wild. It is bright red and grows to 6 mm in diameter and composed of a single basal layer of cells which produce erect filaments some of which produce tetraspores. These tetraspores develop and grow to give rise to the gametophyte generations.

Similar species
Other species of Schmitzia are distinct. S. neapolitana from the North Atlantic and Mediterranean is always terete. 
S. hiscockiana is easily recognizable: it more closely resembles S. evanescens (New Zealand) and S. japonica (Japan and Australia).

References

External links
Schmitzia hiscockiana Maggs et Guiry HabitasOnline, A National Museums Northern Ireland Website
Schmitzia hiscockiana Maggs & Guiry Description and pictures from Michael Guiry's Seaweed Site.

Gigartinales
Species described in 1985